Neil Laurence Bainton (born 2 October 1970) is an English cricket umpire. He was born in Romford, London in 1970.

Bainton was appointed to the list of full-time first-class umpires in late 2005, having officiated his first first-class match in 2000. He has also officiated in several women's and youth internationals. He sits on the board of the ECB Association of Cricket Officials.

References

External links

1970 births
Living people
People from Romford
English cricket umpires